Risoba malagasy  is a species of moth of the family Nolidae first described by Pierre Viette in 1965. It is found in Toliara in south-west Madagascar.

References

Nolidae
Moths of Madagascar
Moths of Africa
Moths described in 1965